Xylacanthus is a monotypic genus of flowering plants belonging to the family Acanthaceae. Its native range is Indo-China. It contains a single species, Xylacanthus laoticus.

References

Acanthaceae